Alice Palmer is a Scottish knitwear designer who has won many awards and is much influenced by Arabic art.

References

External links
List of Publications
 Interview with Alice Palmer

Year of birth missing (living people)
Living people
Scottish designers